SunPass is an electronic toll collection system within the state of Florida, United States. It was created in 1999 by the Florida Department of Transportation's (FDOT's) Office of Toll Operations, operating now as a division of Florida's Turnpike Enterprise (FTE). The system utilizes windshield-mounted RFID transponders manufactured by TransCore and lane equipment designed by companies including TransCore, SAIC, and Raytheon.

History 
SunPass was introduced on April 24, 1999, and by October 1 of the same year, more than 100,000 SunPass transponders had been sold.

In early 2009, all Easy Pay customers automatically became SunPass Plus customers if they opt-in and have the privilege of using their transponders to pay for airport parking at Tampa, Orlando, Palm Beach, Fort Lauderdale and Miami airports. Customers can opt out of the SunPass Plus program.

Functionality 
The Mini was introduced on July 1, 2008, and became available at retail locations. The Mini is a RFID passive transponder, about the size of a credit card, and requires no batteries. The transponder must be mounted on the glass windshield of the vehicle to work properly and, once applied, cannot be removed from a windshield without destroying the pass. The SunPass Mini sticker will not work on motorcycle windshields as they are not made of glass.

SunPass Portable (or SunPass Pro) transponders can be transferred between vehicles. The Sunpass Pro portable transporter offers E-ZPass interoperability, unlike the Mini. Customers must establish an opening account of at least $10 to fund their tolls. Unused toll fees are only refunded if the user closes the account or takes advantage of a money-back guarantee.

Technology

The Turnpike utilizes all-electronic tolling (AET) and toll by plate which handles highway speeds.

Florida's Turnpike Enterprise converted the Homestead Extension of Florida's Turnpike, the Sawgrass Expressway, and the Veterans Expressway to open road tolling, utilizing the SunPass transponders, in September 2010, February 2011, April 2014, and June 2014 respectively, ceasing cash collection. This allows free-flowing movement on both toll roads, moving through toll gantries at the former toll plazas. Motorists without a SunPass are billed through toll by plate. Toll-by-Plate uses cameras and sends a bill to the registered owner of the vehicle. The bill consists of the toll and an administrative fee. If the person fails to pay the toll and accompanying fees at all, the person would be fined $100 plus the tolls owed; in some cases, court costs, points against the driver's license, and the suspension of the license and registration would also be levied.

Interoperability 

SunPass is fully interoperable with E-Pass (from the Central Florida Expressway Authority), O-Pass (from Osceola County, which has been folded into E-Pass), LeeWay (from Lee County toll bridges) and the Miami-Dade Expressway Authority (MDX) toll roads.

SunPass, like other electronic toll collection (ETC) systems in Florida, was not initially compatible with systems outside of Florida. The federal MAP-21 transportation bill passed in July 2012 required all toll facilities to have interoperable road tolling systems by October 1, 2016, but it was not met. SunPass announced in 2012 for plans to eventually become interoperable with E-ZPass. As a step towards this, the older battery-powered SunPass transponders were phased out by the end of 2015; new batteryless models can work with tolling equipment in other states.

On July 29, 2013, Florida's Turnpike Enterprise made an interoperability agreement with North Carolina Turnpike Authority and its NC Quick Pass, allowing SunPass holders to utilize North Carolina's toll roads and lanes.

On November 12, 2014, an interoperability agreement was made with Georgia's Peach Pass, allowing SunPass holders to utilize the I-85 Express lanes and any future toll roads or lanes in the state. 

The C-Pass system operated by Miami-Dade County Public Works on the Rickenbacker and Venetian Causeways was replaced by SunPass and pay-by-plate on September 23, 2014.

In July 2020, E-ZPass announced that SunPass would be compatible with E-ZPass by the end of that year, along with Peach Pass in 2021. On May 28, 2021, the Florida's Turnpike Enterprise announced that its SunPass facilities would begin accepting E-ZPass. In addition, E-ZPass facilities began accepting SunPass Pro transponders (but not earlier SunPass transponders such as the SunPass Portable and SunPass Mini).

On February 27, 2023, it was announced that SunPass was now compatible with the toll roads in Kansas and Oklahoma, as well as on certain toll roads in Texas. Both the SunPass Mini and SunPass Pro transponders are supported. Certain transponders from these three states can be used on all roads maintained by the Florida Turnpike Enterprise. But Kansas, Oklahoma, and Texas transponders currently cannot be used on any roads or portions of roads maintained by the Central Florida Expressway Authority.

See also 
 List of toll roads in Florida

References

External links 
 

Transportation in Florida
Electronic toll collection
Radio-frequency identification
Wireless locating
1999 establishments in Florida